Filip Van Vooren (born 6 August 1962) is a former Belgian racing cyclist. He rode in the 1989 Tour de France.

References

External links

1962 births
Living people
Belgian male cyclists
Sportspeople from Ghent
Cyclists from East Flanders